The following is a list of episodes from the Channel 4 sketch comedy television programme Absolutely.

List of episodes

Series 1: 23 May – 27 June 1989
All episodes were shown on Tuesday nights at 11:00 pm on Channel 4 and ran for 45 minutes.

Series 2: 22 August – 12 October 1990
All episodes were shown on Wednesday nights at 10:00pm on Channel 4 and ran for 45 minutes.

Series 3: 17 May – 5 July 1991
All episodes were shown on Friday nights at 10:30pm on Channel 4 and ran for 35 minutes.

Series 4: 22 January – 26 February 1993 
All episodes were shown on Friday nights at 10:30pm on Channel 4 and ran for 35 minutes.

Absolutely episodes